Transmembrane protease, serine 3 is an enzyme that in humans is encoded by the TMPRSS3 gene.

Function 

This gene encodes a member of the serine protease family. The encoded protein contains a serine protease domain, a transmembrane domain, an LDL receptor-like domain, and a scavenger receptor cysteine-rich domain. Serine proteases are known to be involved in a variety of biological processes, whose malfunction often leads to human diseases and disorders. This gene was identified by its association with both congenital and childhood onset autosomal recessive deafness. This gene is expressed in fetal cochlea and many other tissues, and is thought to be involved in the development and maintenance of the inner ear or the contents of the perilymph and endolymph. This gene was also identified as a tumor associated gene that is overexpressed in ovarian tumors. Four alternatively spliced variants have been described, two of which encode identical products.

References

Further reading